The Guajira Peninsula  (also spelled Goajira, mainly in colonial period texts) is a peninsula in northern Colombia and northwestern Venezuela in the Caribbean.  It is the northernmost peninsula in South America and has an area of  extending from the Manaure Bay (Colombia) to the Calabozo Ensenada in the Gulf of Venezuela (Venezuela), and from the Caribbean to the Serranía del Perijá mountains range.

It was the subject of a historic dispute between Venezuela and Colombia in 1891, and on arbitration was awarded to the latter and joined to its Magdalena Department. Nowadays, most of the territory is part of Colombia, making it part of La Guajira Department. The remaining strip is part of the Venezuelan Zulia State.  The northernmost part of the peninsula is called Punta Gallinas (12° 28´ N) and is also considered the northernmost part of mainland South America.

Climate 

The scenery of Guajira is very picturesque, with wide desert plains and green, foggy mountains. The daytime temperature in the plains is very high, but it is more temperate in the mountains.

The region receives the flow of the trade winds from the northern hemisphere. The northeastern coast of Venezuela and the Antilles have Guajira-Barranquilla xeric scrub.  The trade winds cause a resurgence of the deep littoral waters and make the sea more rich in living species on the western side of the peninsula.  The northeastern flank of the Sierra Nevada de Santa Marta mountain range acts as a barrier that generates abundant rainfall in its steppes, forming the headwaters of the Ranchería River, the only major river in the area.  Climate and vegetation varies from south to north, presenting hyper-humid jungle weather in the southern part (with 3000 mm of rainfall a year) to the desertic areas in the north (300 mm a year).

In the northern area, a small range of mountains known as the Macuira reaches 900 m above sea level; they trap some of the trade winds and mist forms.  Most of the mountain range is a protected area called National Natural Park of Macuira. Nearby there is also the 80 km² Flamingos Fauna and Flora Sanctuary.

Economy

The peninsula is inhabited mainly by members of the native tribe of the Wayuu, who use the plains to raise cattle, sheep, goats and horses. The descendants of Spanish colonists settled in the southeastern part of the peninsula (sometimes referred to as the Padilla Province). This has more fertile land, due to the proximity to other river basins, such as the Cesar river basin. It has been developed for large plantations of cotton and sorghum, and for cattle ranching.

Since the 1980s the central area of the peninsula was subject to the exploration and exploitation of coal and natural gas in the area of Cerrejón and of oil in the littoral.  A popular ecotourism destination in the area is Cabo de la Vela, a headland and village on the peninsula on the Colombia side.

Missionary history 
The mission of Goajira was carried out since the 1880s by Capuchin friars. It was elevated by Pope Pius X on 17 January 1905, into a vicariate Apostolic, dependent on the Congregation for Extraordinary Ecclesiastical Affairs. Mgr Attanasio Maria Vincenzo Soler-Royo, O.F.M. Cap., was appointed to the vicariate, as titular Bishop of Citharizum, on 18 April 1907. The early 20th-century missionaries described the inhabitants of the area as 
"tall and well made. Formerly they were very intractable, but the Capuchins, who were in charge of the Catholic missions, have had a great influence over them, and large numbers have been converted. The chief towns are Paraguaipoa, Calabacito, Maricha, Marocaso and Soldado." The Capuchins established three major orphanages, where they educated Wayuu children in Catholicism, Spanish, and European culture. In the 21st century, the government no longer requires Catholic education for the indigenous peoples. They are allowed to educate their children in the Wayuu traditions and language (Wayuunaiki).

In the novel Papillon (1970), Henri Charrière writes: 
"The Goajira Indians are seafarers who fish for pearls. Their primary diet is said to consist of fish, turtle meat, turtle eggs and big green lizards, most likely Iguanas. Men and women are dressed only in a loincloth which covers their crotch."The women wear dresses of woven cotton; and the men often wear shirts and pants to protect their legs from desert winds and plants.

See also 

 Distocyclus goajira, an electric fish
 T-63 Goajira, a ship of the navy of Venezuela
 Guajira Department, Guajira-Barranquilla xeric scrub and La Guajira Desert

References

Further reading 
 Henri Candelier. 1892. Riohacha y los Indios Guajiros. Crónica de un viajero y explorador francés quien durante tres años, 1889–1892, recorrió La Guajira.
 Martha Ligia Castellanos, Luis Carlos Pardo L. 2000. "Caracterización y primera aproximación a la determinación del índice de biodiversidad en los suelos de la cuenca del arroyo Mekijanao, Serranía de la Macuira, Alta Guajira." En: Juan Carlos Pérez (editor) X Congreso Nacional de la Ciencia del Suelo. Programa y resúmenes. El suelo un componente del medio natural.  Medellín, Octubre 11 al 13 de 2000
 Edith González, Gabriel Guillot, Néstor Miranda, Diana Pombo (editores). 1990. Perfil Ambiental de Colombia. Colciencias. Escala. Bogotá.
 Instituto Geográfico Agustín Codazzi. 1996. Diccionario Geográfico de Colombia. Edición en CD-ROM. Bogotá, Colombia.
Thomas Stadtmüller. 1987. Cloud Forests in the Humid Tropics. A Bibliographic Review. The United Nations University, Centro Agronómico Tropical de Investigación y Enseñanza. Turrialba, Costa Rica. 82 pp.

Peninsulas of Colombia
Peninsulas of Venezuela
Colombian coasts of the Caribbean Sea
Geography of La Guajira Department
Geography of Zulia
Peninsulas of South America